Kiskatinaw Provincial Park is a provincial park located in Peace River Regional District in British Columbia, Canada. It was established on May 1, 1962 to protect a prominent horseshoe-shaped incised meander in the Kiskatinaw River where a historic curved bridge crosses the river along the original alignment of the Alaska Highway.

History

In 1942, following the Japanese bombing of Pearl Harbor, the governments of Canada and the United States initiated the construction of the Alaska Highway to link the U.S. territory of Alaska with the rest of the North American road network. The initial alignment of the highway called for the construction of a curved, banked, wooden trestle bridge across a horseshoe-shaped incised meander of the Kiskatinaw River. Construction of the bridge took only nine months to complete.

On May 1, 1962, the site of the bridge and the incised meander were protected within Kiskatinaw Provincial Park.

In 1978, the British Columbia Ministry of Highways and Public Works constructed a new bridge 3 kilometres (1.86 mi) west of the original bridge and realigned the Alaska Highway there. The bridge is accessible to vehicles and remains the only surviving curved, banked trestle bridge in Western Canada.

Ecology
The park is forested with balsam poplar, white spruce and trembling aspen. Moose and deer may be viewed around the campsite. Squirrels, chipmunks and various songbirds are more common visitors.

Recreation
The following recreational activities are available: vehicle accessible camping and swimming. The primary purpose of the park is to provide weekend recreational opportunities for local residents. The secondary purpose of the park is the provide a stopover point for tourists travelling the Alaska Highway.

See also
List of British Columbia Provincial Parks
List of Canadian provincial parks

References

External links

Peace River Regional District
Provincial parks of British Columbia
1962 establishments in British Columbia
Protected areas established in 1962